Kunwer Sachdev, also known as the Inverter Man of India, is an Indian entrepreneur and businessperson who is the founder of Su-Kam Power Systems, an Indian power company founded in 1998. He is also the mentor of Su-Vastika, an Indian power backup provider started by his wife, Khushbhoo Sachdev, in 2019.

Due to his contribution to creating solar technologies in India, he has been called the 'Solar Man of India' by India Today news magazine. He has been awarded one of 'India's Most Respected Entrepreneurs' by Hurun, a media publishing group. He is also a member of the Gurugram Metropolitan Development Authority, a Government agency in Gurugram, Haryana, India.

Early life
Kunwer Sachdev was born to the late Krishan Lal Sachdeva, a section officer in the Indian Railways.

Education

Kunwar Sachdev completed his primary education at a government school in Delhi's Punjabi Bagh. He wanted to become a doctor since childhood but was destined to become a businessman.

After completing his intermediate education, Sachdev joined Hindu College in Delhi and graduated with a degree in Statistics. After this, he obtained the degree of Bachelor of Laws from the University of Delhi.

Coverage in books and TV shows

Books

Kunwer Sachdev has been featured in author Rashmi Bansal's book "Connect the Dots." This book explores the life stories of 20 self-made Indian entrepreneurs who rose from humble backgrounds to build successful businesses without any formal business training.

Booming Brand by Harsh Pamnani - The book tells the success story of Mr. Kunwer Sachdev, the founder of Su-Kam, and how he built an industry from scratch. Porus Munshi's book 'Making Breakthrough Innovation Happen: How 11 Indians Pulled Off the Impossible' covers the innovation of Kunwer Sachdev's company Su-Kam which created the inverter industry in India.

TV shows
Indian journalist Richa Anirudh interviewed Kunwer Sachdev during IBN Khabar's show Zindagi Live. The show, Zindagi Live, focused on how Sachdev earned 600 crores from scratch. He was also interviewed for ET Now's show Tee Time where he talked about his success mantra.

Awards
Kunwer Sachdev was awarded the 'Entrepreneur of the Year 2011' at the Entrepreneur India Awards. According to EFY Times, the award recognizes achievers and innovators for their contribution to the development of entrepreneurship in India.

References

Living people
Indian industrialists
1962 births
Indian chief executives
20th-century Indian businesspeople
21st-century Indian businesspeople
People from Delhi
Indian businesspeople
Indian inventors